Adam Williams may refer to:
 Adam Williams (actor) (1922–2006), American actor
 Adam Williams (baseball), American baseball player
 Adam Williams (basketball) (born 1983), basketball player
Adam Williams, character in Cold Feet, played by James Nesbitt